The 1971 Dallas Cowboys season was the franchise's 12th season in the National Football League (NFL), the first at the new Texas Stadium in suburban Irving, Texas and the 12th season under head coach Tom Landry. The Cowboys led the NFL with 406 points scored. Their defense allowed 222 points.

For the sixth consecutive season, the Cowboys had a first-place finish. They won their second-consecutive NFC championship, then defeated the Miami Dolphins in Super Bowl VI to capture their first Super Bowl championship. They were the first team from the NFC to win a Super Bowl since the 1970 merger of the NFL and the American Football League (AFL), and subsequently, the first team from the NFC East division to win the title.

NFL Draft
The 1971 NFL Draft was one of the worst in the history of the franchise, although the Cowboys recovered draft choices by trading Tody Smith and Ike Thomas to other teams. Third-round selection Bill Gregory played seven seasons with the Cowboys, winning two Super Bowl rings. Eighth-round selection Ron Jessie was cut after the Cowboys acquired San Diego Chargers All-Pro Lance Alworth, but went on to enjoy a long and successful NFL career with the Detroit Lions and Los Angeles Rams.

Preseason

Season recap
The Cowboys opened the new Texas Stadium with a 44–21 win over the New England Patriots on Oct. 24. Duane Thomas scored the first touchdown, a 56-yard run two minutes and 16 seconds after the start of the game. Attendance was 65,708 persons.

The team entered the season still having the reputation of "not being able to win the big games" and "next year's champion". The Super Bowl V loss added more fuel to that widely held view. As in the previous season, Dallas had a quarterback controversy as Roger Staubach and Craig Morton alternated as starting quarterback (in a loss to the Bears in game 7, Morton and Staubach alternated plays). The Cowboys were 4–3 at the season midpoint. But after head coach Tom Landry settled on Staubach, the Cowboys won their last seven regular season games to finish with an 11–3 record.

Staubach finished the regular season as the NFL's top rated passer (101.8) by throwing for 1,882 yards, 15 touchdowns, and only 4 interceptions. He was also a terrific rusher, gaining 343 yards and 2 touchdowns on 41 carries. Said Cold Hard Football Facts of Staubach's 1971 season, "Staubach finally out-jockeyed Craig Morton for the starting gig with the Cowboys in 1971 and instantly produced one of the greatest passing seasons in history. The numbers are not big and gaudy, but they were ruthlessly efficient –- the 104.8 passer rating truly amazing in a season in which the average rating was 62.2. His 8.9 [yards-per-attempt] in the regular season is phenomenal in any era of the NFL, as was his 18 [touchdowns] against a meager 4 [interceptions] (including postseason). The Cowboys did not lose a single one of Staubach's 13 starts in 1971 and –- most impressively –- he lifted the proverbial "team that couldn't win the big game" to its long-awaited first NFL championship.[...]"

Dallas also had an outstanding trio of running backs, Walt Garrison, Duane Thomas, and Calvin Hill, who rushed for a combined total of 1,690 yards and 14 touchdowns during the season. Garrison led the team in receptions during the season. (Thomas, upset that the Cowboys would not renegotiate his contract after his excellent rookie year, had stopped talking to the press and to almost everyone on the team). Wide receivers Bob Hayes and Lance Alworth also provided a deep threat, catching a combined total of 69 passes for 1,327 yards and 10 touchdowns. The offensive line, anchored by all-pro tackle Rayfield Wright, Pro Bowlers John Niland and Ralph Neely, and #64 Tony Liscio who was coaxed out of retirement by Tom Landry after Ralph Neely got injured off the field, was also a primary reason for their success on offense. (Neely had broken his leg in November in a dirt-bike accident, and was replaced first by Gregg and then by Tony Liscio, who came out of retirement.)

The Dallas defense (nicknamed the "Doomsday Defense") had given up only one touchdown in the last 25 quarters prior to the Super Bowl. Their defensive line was anchored by Pro Bowl defensive tackle Bob Lilly, who excelled at pressuring quarterbacks and breaking up running plays. Dallas also had an outstanding trio of linebackers: Pro Bowler Chuck Howley, who recorded 5 interceptions and returned them for 122 yards; Dave Edwards 2 interceptions; and Lee Roy Jordan, who recorded 2 interceptions.  The Cowboys secondary was led by 2 future hall of fame cornerbacks Herb Adderley (6 interceptions for 182 return yards) and Mel Renfro (4 interceptions for 11 yards).  Safeties Cliff Harris and Pro Bowler Cornell Green also combined for 4 interceptions.After the 1971 Bob Lilly would play in the last of his last pro bowl despite being selected after the 1972 and 1973 seasons.Lilly would also score his final career touchdown in a 42–7 smashing of The Philadelphia Eagles.Lilly would retire  with the NFL record of scoring the most tds by a defensive lineman with 4.

 September 26, 1971 – Herb Adderley became the first Cowboy to have three interceptions in one game.
 October 11, 1971 – The Cowboys earned their first win on Monday Night Football by defeating the New York Giants 20–13, which was also the last game the Cowboys played in the Cotton Bowl.

Schedule

Division opponents are in bold text

Standings

Game summaries

Week 1

Week 2

Week 3

Week 4

    
    
    
    
    
    
    

Last game at the Cotton Bowl

Week 6

    
    
    
    
    
    
    
    
    
    
    

Dallas' first game at Texas Stadium.

Week 7

Week 8

Week 9

Playoffs

NFC Divisional Playoff

NFC Championship Game

Super Bowl VI

Roster

Awards and records
 Led NFC, Fewest Rushing Yards Allowed, 1,144 yards
 Led NFL, 401 Points Scored
 Led NFL, 5,035 Total Yards Gained
 Herb Adderley, Three Interceptions in One Game, Club Record
 Roger Staubach, MVP, Super Bowl VI
 Roger Staubach, NFL Passing Leader
 Roger Staubach, Led NFL, 2,786 pass yards
 Roger Staubach, Bert Bell Award
 Roger Staubach, NFC Pro Bowl
 Roger Staubach, All-Pro Quarterback
 Duane Thomas, NFL Touchdown Leader (13 – 11 Rushing, 2 Receiving)

References

External links
1971 Dallas Cowboys season
1971 Dallas Cowboys

Dallas
Dallas Cowboys seasons
NFC East championship seasons
National Football Conference championship seasons
Super Bowl champion seasons
Dallas Cowboys